is a 2012 Japanese suspense horror film directed by . It was released on April 21, 2012.

Cast
 Aika Ōta as Saeki
 Natsumi Hirajima as Hagiwara
 Ryoichi Yuki

References

2010s Japanese films
2012 horror films
2012 films
Japanese horror films